The Karoo toad,  Gariep toad, or mountain toad (Vandijkophrynus gariepensis) is a species of toad in the family Bufonidae found in southern Namibia, much of South Africa, Lesotho, and Eswatini. It is an abundant species that occurs in many types habitat: fynbos heathland, succulent karoo, thickets, grassland, and Nama Karoo. Breeding takes place in permanent and temporary waterbodies (e.g., streams, waterholes, lakes, rain pools, even hoof prints). There are no significant threats to this adaptable species.

References

gariepensis
Frogs of Africa
Amphibians of Namibia
Amphibians of South Africa
Vertebrates of Lesotho
Vertebrates of Eswatini
Near threatened animals
Near threatened biota of Africa
Amphibians described in 1848
Taxa named by Andrew Smith (zoologist)
Taxonomy articles created by Polbot